İncirliova railway station is a railway station in İncirliova, Turkey. It is located adjacent to the D.550 state highway, known as Asteğmen Süleyman Çamlıca Boulevard within the town. TCDD Taşımacılık operates regional train service from İzmir and Söke to Nazilli and Denizli, via Aydın.

İncirliova station was built in 1866 by the Ottoman Railway Company as part of their railway from İzmir to Aydın.

Pictures

References

External links
TCDD Taşımacılık

Railway stations in Aydın Province
Railway stations opened in 1866
1866 establishments in the Ottoman Empire